Potassium intermediate/small conductance calcium-activated channel, subfamily N, member 4, also known as KCNN4, is a human gene encoding the KCa3.1 protein.

Function 

The KCa3.1 protein is part of a potentially heterotetrameric voltage-independent potassium channel that is activated by intracellular calcium. Activation is followed by membrane hyperpolarization, which promotes calcium influx. The encoded protein may be part of the predominant calcium-activated potassium channel in T-lymphocytes. This gene is similar to other KCNN family potassium channel genes, but it differs enough to possibly be considered as part of a new subfamily.

History
The channel activity was first described in 1958 by György Gárdos in human erythrocytes. The channel is also named Gardos channel because of its discoverer.

See also 
 SK channel
 Voltage-gated potassium channel
 Senicapoc

References

Further reading 

 
 
 
 
 
 
 
 
 
 
 
 
 
 
 
 
 
 
 
 
 
 

Ion channels